Siamun is an ancient Egyptian personal name for males, Manuel de Codage transliteration: s3-jmn, meaning "Son of Amun." Its female version is Sitamun.

 Netjerkheperre-setepenamun Siamun, Egyptian pharaoh of the 21st Dynasty
 Siamun (son of Ahmose I)
 Siamun (son of Thutmose III)
 A son of Ramesses II, No. 25 on the list of princes

Ancient Egyptian given names
Theophoric names